The 2013 Abu Dhabi Grand Prix (formally known as the 2013 Formula 1 Etihad Airways Abu Dhabi Grand Prix) was a Formula One motor race that was held at the Yas Marina Circuit on 3 November 2013. The race was the seventeenth round of the 2013 season, and marked the 5th running of the Abu Dhabi Grand Prix.

The race, contested over 55 laps, was won by Sebastian Vettel, driving a Red Bull. Mark Webber finished second, and by Nico Rosberg driving a Mercedes was third. Vettel won the race 30.8s ahead of his Red Bull teammate Mark Webber.
Vettel's victory equalled Alberto Ascari and Michael Schumacher's record in 1953 and 2004 record for most consecutive wins in a season. This was Red Bull's 100th podium. Adrian Sutil scored his last World Championship points at this race, as well as Paul di Resta.

Report

Background

Partial solar eclipse

During the race it was possible to observe a partial solar eclipse from 17:22 local time to 17:39 local time when the Sun set, and this was shown briefly during the race live broadcast.

Tyres
Like the 2012 Abu Dhabi Grand Prix, tyre supplier Pirelli brought its white-banded medium compound tyre as the harder "prime" tyre and the yellow-banded soft compound tyre as the softer "option" tyre.

Free Practice
Romain Grosjean and Lewis Hamilton were top in the first practice session.

Red Bull drivers were fastest in the second practice session with Vettel leading Webber by a tenth of a second.

During third practice Mercedes and Red Bull were close at the top and the session ended with Vettel two-tenths of a second ahead of Webber who in turn was less than a hundredth of a second faster than Hamilton's Mercedes.

Qualifying
Webber qualified in pole position ahead of his Red Bull teammate Vettel who qualified in second. The Mercedes drivers of Hamilton and Rosberg qualified on the second row of the grid. Fernando Alonso was the highest placed driver in the World Championship standings who failed to qualify for the final round of qualifying.

Jules Bianchi was penalised before the start of qualifying five places on the grid for an unscheduled gearbox change.

Post-qualifying
Kimi Räikkönen was excluded from qualifying and was relegated to twenty-second place on the grid having originally qualified fifth place on the grid after his car failed a floor deflection test.

Race
The race began with Vettel in second on the grid overtaking Webber into the first corner and then leading until the chequered flag. Rosberg moved up to second position, while Kimi Räikkönen, starting from the back of the grid, broke his front-right suspension after contact with Giedo van der Garde, causing Räikkönen to retire from the race. German Nico Hülkenberg, during his first pit-stop was deemed to have been unsafely released and was given a drive through penalty.
Grosjean, advanced from sixth on the grid to fourth after the start. During the first half of the race, Felipe Massa led his team-mate Alonso, but was overtaken by Alonso in the latter stages of the race. After Alonso's second pit-stop, he came out of the pitlane and moved around backmarker Jean-Éric Vergne, going off the racetrack with all four wheels in a move that consequently caused Massa to run wide into turn five. Vettel won the race by 30.8s over Webber.

Post race
During the cool down lap Vettel and Webber performed doughnuts. As Vettel had done one after the previous race in India, this time he incurred no penalty from the stewards.

Alonso was sent for precautionary medical checks after a kerb impact measured at 25g.

Classification

Qualifying

Notes:
 - Kimi Räikkönen qualified fifth, but was disqualified from qualifying when his car failed a floor deflection test.
 - Jules Bianchi qualified twentieth, but penalised five grid places for an unscheduled gearbox change and started from twenty-first after Räikkönen was disqualified from qualifying.

Race

Championship standings after the race

Drivers' Championship standings

Constructors' Championship standings

 Note: Only the top five positions are included for both sets of standings.

See also 
 2013 Yas Marina GP2 Series round
 2013 Yas Marina GP3 Series round

References

External links

Abu Dhabi
2013 in Emirati motorsport
Abu Dhabi Grand Prix
November 2013 sports events in Asia